Erigeron aquarius is a Central American species of flowering plant in the family Asteraceae. It has been found only in Guatemala and Honduras. The type specimen was collected in Guatemala in 1939.

Erigeron aquarius is  a perennial subshrub with a woody stem up to 50 cm (20 inches) tall, producing a woody underground rhizome. Stems are sometimes erect (standing straight up), moderately hairy. Leaves are moderately hairy, some produced close to the ground plus others higher on the stem. The plant produces flower heads on long, thin stalks. Each head contains 80-180 white ray florets surrounding numerous yellow disc florets.

References

External links

Photo of herbarium specimen at Missouri Botanical Garden, collected in Honduras in 1992

aquarius
Flora of Honduras
Flora of Guatemala
Plants described in 1940